Clarence is a location in New South Wales, Australia. It was originally a railway outpost on the original railway line across the Blue Mountains, but by 1908 when Clarence was used as headquarters for the Ten Tunnels Deviation works, the town population had flourished to over 5,000 residents, the majority being the navvies employed on the deviation works. When the deviation was opened in 1910, the town population quickly fell, despite a new platform built on the new deviation.

History
Clarence was originally a railway outpost on the Main Western railway line. The original railway station was opened in 1869 and closed in 1910 when the Zig Zag Railway was bypassed for the Ten Tunnels Deviation.

Population
In the 2016 Census, there were 200 people in Clarence. 74.6% of people were born in Australia and  87.6% of people spoke only English at home.

Zig Zag Railway

In 1975, the Lithgow Zig Zag, which had been abandoned for 65 years was taken over by the Zig Zag Railway enthusiast enterprise. Narrow gauge track was laid on the alignment and several withdrawn ex-Q.R steam locomotives were imported for use on the Zig Zag tourist line. Today, it is one of Australia's most well-known tourist lines and the original station at Clarence has since been restored for use as the terminus.

There is the nearby Clarence Colliery, opened in the 1970s, that was closed and then re-opened again. It is served by a loop line that branches off Newnes Junction.

See also

References

 
 
 

Communities in the Blue Mountains (New South Wales)
City of Lithgow